Ohrenbrücker Tor is the southwestern gate in  the city wall of Ingelheim am Rhein.

Etymology
Ohrenbrücke is generally accepted to derive from the Obere Brücke (Upper bridge). During the Middle Ages only two bridges across the Selz existed: the “Lower Bridge” at the ancient Altengässer Tor and the “Upper Bridge” at the Ohrenbrücker Tor.

Architecture 
The gate comprises two towers and a gothic arch. The northern tower had been reconstructed together with the arch in the middle of the 20th century. It is assumed that at the top of the two of the towers, a slender upright spires at the top of their buttress existed. The gate was equipped with a machicolation above the arch. Both towers are decorated with Lombard bands.

History 
The first reference to the gate dates back to the 13th century. It had been erected as an infrastructure provision  for the Westerberg. Naturally the terrain outside the gate was a marshy ground fed by the Selz. It was difficult to come inside or outside the town by carts. Simply a small bridge for pedestrians existed.

Literature 
 Karl Heinz Henn: Die Ortsbefestigung von Ober-Ingelheim. in: Beiträge zur Ingelheimer Geschichte, Heft 36, 1987

External links 

Ingelheim am Rhein
Gates in Germany
Heritage sites in Rhineland-Palatinate
Fortifications in Germany
Buildings and structures in Mainz-Bingen